Gotta Get Thru This is the debut studio album by English-New Zealand singer Daniel Bedingfield. The album was released on 26 August 2002 by Polydor Records. It reached number two on the UK Albums Chart, and is certified five times platinum, having sold over 1.63 million copies. Worldwide, the album has sold over 4 million copies.

Six singles were released from the album, including the number-one hits "Gotta Get Thru This", "If You're Not the One" and "Never Gonna Leave Your Side".

Track listing

Notes
 signifies an additional producer.
 signifies a co-producer.
"Inflate My Ego" contains portions of "Peter Gunn Theme", written by Henry Mancini and performed by The Blues Brothers.

Credits and personnel
Daniel Bedingfield – primary artist, guitar, producer, composer
Miles Bould – percussion
Danny Cummings – percussion
Ned Douglas – engineer, producer, programming
Stephen Emmanuel – mixing, producer
Leo Green – saxophone
Isobel Griffiths – orchestra contractor
Matt Holland – trumpet
Greg Lester – guitar
Christian Saint Val – assistant
Derrick Santini – photography
Robin Smith – conductor, string arrangements
The Solid Rock Choir – composer
Ali Staton – producer
Al Stone – mixing, producer
Jeff Taylor – remixing
Lewis Taylor – bass, guitar, Hammond organ
Jong Uk-yoon – assistant

Charts and certifications

Weekly charts

Year-end charts

Certifications

References

2002 debut albums
Daniel Bedingfield albums
Polydor Records albums
Albums produced by Mark Taylor (music producer)